Jack Little may refer to:

John N. Little, known as Jack, American electrical engineer
Jack Little (songwriter) (1899–1956), British-born American composer and songwriter
Jack Little (baseball) (1891–1961), American baseball player
Jack Little (rugby league), Australian rugby league footballer, who played during the 1933–34 Kangaroo tour of Great Britain
Jack Little (broadcaster) (1908–1986), American-Australian radio and television presenter, wrestling commentator
Jack Little (politician) (1914–1988), Australian politician
Jack Little (American football) (born 1931), American football player and coach
Jack Little (footballer) (1885–1965), footballer for Crystal Palace

See also
John Little (disambiguation)